Debbie Wood (born May 25, 1965) is an American politician from Alabama. Wood is a Republican member of the Alabama House of Representatives from the 38th district, serving since 2018.

Early life and career
Wood owns a real estate business in Valley, AL.  She is a member of Langdale United Methodist Church.

Political career
Wood ran against the chairman of the county commission in Chambers County in 2002 and was the first female elected to represent District 6.  She would later become the first female to serve as the chairperson for the County Commission.  She served 4 terms and Wood ran for the House seat after the incumbent, Isaac Whorton, announced he was running for circuit judge. Wood defeated fellow Republican Todd Rauch by 8 votes in the state's July primary runoff. She defeated Democrat Brian McGee in the November 2018 general election.

References

Living people
Republican Party members of the Alabama House of Representatives
Women state legislators in Alabama
1961 births
21st-century American politicians
21st-century American women politicians